Shupe Run is a  long 2nd order tributary to Jacobs Creek in Westmoreland County, Pennsylvania.

Course
Shupe Run rises about 0.25 miles north of Mount Pleasant, Pennsylvania, and then flows south to join Jacobs Creek at Buckeye.

Watershed
Shupe Run drains  of area, receives about 42.5 in/year of precipitation, has a wetness index of 415.01, and is about 20% forested.

References

 
Tributaries of the Ohio River
Rivers of Pennsylvania
Rivers of Westmoreland County, Pennsylvania
Allegheny Plateau